A cue sheet, or cue file, is a metadata file which describes how the tracks of a CD or DVD are laid out. Cue sheets are stored as plain text files and commonly have a  filename extension. CDRWIN first introduced cue sheets, which are now supported by many optical disc authoring applications and media players.

Overview
Cue sheets can describe many types of audio and data CDs. The main data (including audio) for a CD described by a cue sheet is stored in one or more files referenced by the cue sheet. Cue sheets also specify track lengths and CD-Text including track and disc titles and performers. They are especially useful when dividing audio stored in a single file into multiple songs or tracks. The data files referred to by the cue sheet may be audio files (commonly in MP3 or WAV format), or plain disc images, usually with a  extension.

When used for disc images, the format is usually called CUE/BIN, indicating that it stores a disc image composed of one cue sheet file and one or more  files. The  files are raw sector-by-sector binary copies of tracks in the original discs. These binary  files usually contain all 2,352 bytes from each sector in an optical disc, including control headers and error correction data in the case of CD-ROMs (unlike ISO images of CD-ROMs, which store only the user data). However, the TRACK command in a cue sheet file can be used to refer to binary disc images that contain only the user data of each sector, by indicating the specific CD mode of the tracks from which the image was created (which is necessary to know the size of the user data in each sector).

The BIN/CUE format is one of the few formats besides Nero's NRG, Alcohol 120%'s MDF/MDS and CloneCD's CCD/IMG/SUB disc image formats to support Mixed Mode CDs which can contain audio CD tracks as well as data tracks.

The name "cue sheet" originates from the "send cue sheet" SCSI/ATA command in optical disc authoring. The specification for that command defines a cue sheet format containing mostly the same information, but in a tabular, binary data structure, rather than a text file.

Audio file playback 
An entire multi-track audio CD may be ripped to a single audio file and a cue sheet. However, software audio players and hardware digital audio players often treat each audio file as a single playlist entry, which can make it difficult to select and identify the individual tracks. A common solution is to split the original audio file into a series of separate files, one per track.

Another approach is for the audio player to support the cue sheet directly. This may involve providing a new playlist (for example, an extra window) for the contents of the cue sheet, or adding an entry for each track directly into the main playlist.

Cue sheet syntax 
A cue sheet is a plain text file containing commands with one or more parameters. The commands usually apply either to the whole disc or to an individual track, depending on the particular command and the context. They may describe the layout of data to be written, or CD-Text (metadata). The original specification of the cue sheet syntax and semantics appears in the CDRWIN User Guide.

The standard commands are:

Essential commands 

Names a file containing the data and its format (such as MP3, and WAVE audio file formats, and plain "binary" disc images)

Defines a track context, providing its number and type or mode (for instance  or various CD-ROM modes). Some commands that follow this command apply to the track rather than the entire disc.

Indicates an index (position) within the current . The position is specified in mm:ss:ff (minute-second-frame) format. There are 75 such frames per second of audio. In the context of cue sheets, "frames" refer to CD sectors, despite a different, lower-level structure in CDs also being known as frames.   is required and denotes the start of the track, while  is optional and denotes the pregap. The pregap of Track 1 is used for Hidden Track One Audio (HTOA). Optional higher-numbered indexes (02 through 99) are also allowed.
 and 
Indicates the length of a track's pregap or postgap, which is not stored in any data file.

CD-Text and other metadata commands 

Adds a comment that usually has no bearing on the written CD at all, with the exception of some applications that use it to store additional metadata (e.g. Exact Audio Copy writes some additional fields, which foobar2000 can read). REM should not appear on a line by itself as some applications regard it as a syntax error.

Identifies a file containing CD-Text information

Sets subcode flags of a track

Contains the UPC/EAN code of the disc

Define the ISRC of the current 
,  and 
CD-Text metadata; applies to the whole disc or a specific track, depending on the context

Non-standard cue sheets 
CD ripping programs normally offer the option of creating a separate file for each audio track, with the (pre)gap portion of a track placed at the end of the preceding track's file. This coincides with normal playback operation – the beginning of each file is the beginning of a track, not the gap preceding it – and with the layout described in the disc's table of contents, which doesn't specify gap information at all.

The cue sheet format, as specified in the CDRWIN Users Manual, doesn't support file sets of this type; rather, it's designed with the expectation that all of the audio data exists in a single file (CDRWIN only creates cue sheets for that kind of rip) or in separate files, but only with the gap portions of the audio either removed or placed at the beginning of the files.

In order to allow cue sheets to be used to burn a CD from ordinary file sets which have the gap portion at the end of each file, the CD ripping & burning program Exact Audio Copy (EAC) allows the creation of cue sheets that relax the CDRWIN Users Manual's restriction on where FILE commands can be used. This non-conforming cue sheet format, intended only for burning CDs with EAC, is not supported by some other pieces of software, such as the media player foobar2000, which allows the use of cue sheets as playlists.

Examples 

The MP3 file "Faithless - Live in Berlin.mp3", contains a live recording of the band Faithless. At this concert, Faithless performed eight songs in the order shown below. Therefore, the track listing is as follows:
Faithless – Reverence
Faithless – She's My Baby
Faithless – Take the Long Way Home
Faithless – Insomnia
Faithless – Bring the Family Back
Faithless – Salva Mea
Faithless – Dirty Old Man
Faithless – God Is a DJ

Since the MP3 is one file containing the entire performance, burning it to a CD as-is would make it inconvenient to skip to individual songs. To design the cue sheet, one must first find the points in the MP3 at which each song starts. The times are cumulative: each track must have a later time than the previous one.

The first five lines denote the disc information. This is followed by the information for each track, indented from the rest. The  line reads the same for each track, with the exception of the time value that follows it.

 REM GENRE Electronica
 REM DATE 1998
 PERFORMER "Faithless"
 TITLE "Live in Berlin"
 FILE "Faithless - Live in Berlin.mp3" MP3
   TRACK 01 AUDIO
     TITLE "Reverence"
     PERFORMER "Faithless"
     INDEX 01 00:00:00
   TRACK 02 AUDIO
     TITLE "She's My Baby"
     PERFORMER "Faithless"
     INDEX 01 06:42:00
   TRACK 03 AUDIO
     TITLE "Take the Long Way Home"
     PERFORMER "Faithless"
     INDEX 01 10:54:00
   TRACK 04 AUDIO
     TITLE "Insomnia"
     PERFORMER "Faithless"
     INDEX 01 17:04:00
   TRACK 05 AUDIO
     TITLE "Bring the Family Back"
     PERFORMER "Faithless"
     INDEX 01 25:44:00
   TRACK 06 AUDIO
     TITLE "Salva Mea"
     PERFORMER "Faithless"
     INDEX 01 30:50:00
   TRACK 07 AUDIO
     TITLE "Dirty Old Man"
     PERFORMER "Faithless"
     INDEX 01 38:24:00
   TRACK 08 AUDIO
     TITLE "God Is a DJ"
     PERFORMER "Faithless"
     INDEX 01 42:35:00

An example of a cue sheet used in conjunction with a CD image file:

 FILE "sampleimage.bin" BINARY
   TRACK 01 MODE1/2352
     INDEX 01 00:00:00

See also
Comparison of audio player software#Metadata ability
Comparison of video player software#Metadata ability
Comparison of disc authoring software
Exact Audio Copy (EAC) – a proprietary CD ripping program
MusicBrainz Picard – a cross-platform MusicBrainz tag editor written in Python
XSPF – an XML-based playlist format for digital media

References

External links 
 Cue sheet page on the Hydrogenaudio Knowledgebase web site
 CUE sheet format documentation

Compact disc
Metadata